The Bou Regreg is a river located in western Morocco which discharges to the Atlantic Ocean between the cities of Rabat and Salé.  The estuary of this river is termed Wadi Sala.

The river is 240 kilometres long, with a tidal estuary of approximately 24 kilometres extending upriver. Its average discharge is 23 m3/s and can reach 1500 m3/s during periods of flooding. The source of the river originates from the Middle Atlas mountains at an altitude of 1627 meters on the level of Jbel Mtourzgane (Province of Khemisset) and of Grou (Province of Khénifra) and descends to its mouth at the Atlantic Ocean separating the cities of Rabat to the south and Salé to the north.

Water quality
Water quality issues of the Bou Regreg include tidal saltwater intrusion, excessive runoff of nitrates from agricultural land uses and mercury contamination thought to arise from use of certain pesticides within the drainage basin.

History
The Phoenicians and the Carthaginians, who founded several colonies in Morocco, inhabited the banks of the Bou Regreg approximately two kilometers from its mouth at the ancient site of Chellah.  This archaeological site contains the ruins of a Roman town known as Sala Colonia and referred to as Sala by Ptolemy.  Chellah was a significant ancient port city with remains including the Decumanus Maximus, or principal roadway, as well as those of a forum, a monumental fountain, a triumphal arch, and other Roman ruins.

See also
 Hajja
 Republic of Bou Regreg

References

Rivers of Morocco
Rabat
Geography of Rabat-Salé-Kénitra